Mystical Truth is a studio album by the Jamaican reggae band Black Uhuru. It was released in 1993 through Mesa Recordings. The album peaked at number 6 on the US Billboard World Albums chart and was nominated for Grammy Award for Best Reggae Album at 36th Annual Grammy Awards.

Track listing

Personnel 

 Derrick Simpson – vocals, composer, producer
 Ived "Sen-C" Campbell – backing vocals
 Lisa Hewitt – backing vocals
 Vann Johnson – backing vocals
 Zac Harmon – backing vocals, guitar, bass, drums, producer
 Louie Rankin – guest artist (track 7)
 Bob Brockman – guitar, bass, piano, synthesizer, strings, drums, congas, percussion, timbales, drum programming, producer, mixing
 Earl "Chinna" Smith – guitar
 Anthony Brissett – bass, piano, synthesizer, percussion, arranger
 Christopher Meridith – bass
 Earl "Bagga" Walker – bass
 Christopher Troy – piano, keyboards, drums, producer, arranger
 Noel Davis – piano, synthesizer
 Chico Chin – horns
 David Madden – horns
 Dean Fraser – horns
 Nambo Robinson – horns
 Rass Brass – horns
 Marcus "Rangatan" Smith – drums & percussion
 George "Dusty" Miller – drums & percussion
 Lowell Fillmore Dunbar – drums
 Jermaine Forde – drums
 Harry T. Powell – percussion
 George Nauful – executive producer
 Jim Snowden – executive producer
 Claire McNally – production coordinator
 Steve Sykes – mixing
 David Rowe – engineering
 Lynford "Fatta" Marshall – engineering
 Rohan Richards – engineering
 Karl Tappin – engineering
 Rob Groome – assistant engineering
 Vincent Henry – assistant engineering
 Mark Johnson – assistant engineering
 Steve Hall – mastering
 Howard Alston – horns, flute, saxophone
 Michelle Laurencot – art direction & design
 Ron Larson – art direction
 Nathaniel Welch – photography

Charts

References

External links 

1992 albums
Black Uhuru albums